Ron Hynes (December 7, 1950 – November 19, 2015) was a folk singer-songwriter from Newfoundland and Labrador. He was especially known for his composition "Sonny's Dream", which has been recorded worldwide by many artists and was named the 41st greatest Canadian song of all time on the 2005 CBC Radio One series 50 Tracks: The Canadian Version.

Biography
Ron Hynes was born in St. John's, Newfoundland and Labrador in December 1950, and raised in Ferryland. He was a founding member of The Wonderful Grand Band, one of Newfoundland's most popular performing groups, and has released seven solo albums. His debut album, Discovery, released in 1972, was the first album composed of totally original content by a Newfoundland artist. Hynes is a seven-time East Coast Music Awards winner, and past Juno and Canadian Country Music Awards nominee. He was named Artist of the Year ('92) and was presented with the prestigious Arts Achievement Award (2004) by the Newfoundland/Labrador Arts Council. In 2002, Hynes received an honorary Doctor of Letters from Memorial University in St. John's in recognition of his original songwriting and his contribution to the cultural heritage of Newfoundland. In 2006, Hynes was honored as the recipient of the St. John's Folk Arts Council's Lifetime Achievement Award.

Widely regarded as one of Canada's premier singer-songwriters with a career spanning over 30 years, Hynes' songs have become part of the fabric of Newfoundland culture. His work is also known outside the province; Hynes' songs have been covered worldwide by over 100 artists, including Emmylou Harris, Valdy and Christy Moore.

Most recently, Hynes was the winner of Male Solo Recording of the Year at the 2007 East Coast Music Awards, and picked up three awards at the 2006 MusicNL awards show in November 2006. The awards included Entertainer of the Year, Songwriter of the Year and Folk/Roots Artist of the Year.

Hynes narrated two audiobooks for Rattling Books, Hard Light: 32 Little Stories by Michael Crummey and Death on the Ice by Cassie Brown.

Illness and death
In July 2012, it was announced that Ron Hynes was diagnosed with throat cancer. On August 11, 2012, Hynes performed to a sold-out crowd of more than 3,000 at the Mile One Centre in St. John's. This was his last performance before undergoing cancer treatment.  The concert included a reunion of Hynes' old band, The Wonderful Grand Band. In the fall of 2013, he was in remission and back on tour, including participation in a Vinyl Cafe tour broadcast on CBC Radio. Hynes died at a hospital in St. John's on November 19, 2015, at the age of 64.

After Hynes' death, actor and writer Joel Thomas Hynes, his nephew, announced on Facebook that Hynes suffered from drug addictions that led to his demise. "He remained a hardcore addict right to his final days. And it killed him.", said Joel Thomas Hynes.

Stage and screen career
Hynes had starred on screen and stage as an actor/writer in numerous roles dating back to the 1970s, including The Bard of Prescott Street, "Wonderful Grand Band", The Best of CODCO, Hank Williams: The Show He Never Gave, The Island Opry Show, The Lost Island Opry, Secret Nation, Anchor Zone and Dooley Gardens.

Discography

Albums

An independent tribute album, entitled 11:11 – Newfoundland Women Sing Songs by Ron and Connie Hynes, was also released in 1997, with Newfoundland's finest female artists performing songs written by Ron Hynes and his ex-wife Connie.

A documentary on Hynes, entitled Man of a Thousand Songs and directed by William MacGillivray, debuted at the 2010 Toronto International Film Festival.

Singles

Videography
 Cryer's Paradise, 1993;
 Godspeed, 1997;
 Ron Hynes – The Irish Tour, 2000 (full-length documentary);
 A Good Dog Is Lost, 2002;
 Record Man, 2003.
 THE MAN OF A THOUSAND SONGS, 2010, (feature documentary).

Awards and nominations
2007 ECMA
 won Male Artist of the Year
 nominated Album of the Year for the album Ron Hynes
 nominated Entertainer of the Year
 nominated Songwriter of the Year for the song Dry
2004 ECMA
 won Album of the Year for the album Get Back Change
 won Country Recording of the Year for the album Get Back Change
1999 ECMA
 nominated Male Artist of the Year
1998 ECMA
 nominated Country Recording of the Year
 nominated Male Artist of the Year	
 nominated Songwriter of the Year for the song Godspeed
 nominated Video of the Year for Godspeed
1994 ECMA
 nominated Album of the Year for album Cryer's Paradise 
 won Country Recording of the Year
 won Male Artist of the Year
 won Song of the Year for the song Man of a Thousand Songs 
 nominated Video of the Year for Cryer's Paradise
1992 ECMA
 nominated Song of the Year for the song Never Met a Liar 
1991 ECMA
 nominated Male Artist of the Year
2009 SOCAN Awards
 won National Achievement Award

References

External links
 Ron's website with photos, biography and more
 
 CBC – Absolutely Canadian – Ron Hynes, Man of a Thousand Songs
 Ronald Hynes – Encyclopedia of Newfoundland and Labrador, v. 3, p. 15
 

Canadian country singer-songwriters
Canadian folk singer-songwriters
Canadian male singer-songwriters
1950 births
2015 deaths
Musicians from St. John's, Newfoundland and Labrador
Deaths from cancer in Newfoundland and Labrador
Deaths from throat cancer
Best Original Song Genie and Canadian Screen Award winners